Göltarla may refer to:

 Göltarla, Elmalı, village in the District of Elmalı, Antalya Province, Turkey
 Göltarla, Samsat, village in the District of Samsat, Adıyaman Province, Turkey